The 2013 LPGA Tour was a series of weekly golf tournaments for elite female golfers from around the world. The Tour began in Australia on February 14 and ended on November 24 in Florida. The tournaments were sanctioned by the United States-based Ladies Professional Golf Association (LPGA).

Inbee Park of South Korea won the most tournaments, six, including three majors. She also led the money list for the second straight year and won the Rolex Player of the Year award. Stacy Lewis won the Vare Trophy for lowest scoring average, the first American to win since 1994. Three players, Lewis, Park, and Suzann Pettersen had scoring averages below 70, for the first time in LPGA Tour history. Moriya Jutanugarn of Thailand won the Rookie of the Year award.

Schedule and results
The number in parentheses after winners' names is the player's total number wins in official money individual events on the LPGA Tour, including that event.

Season leaders
Money list leaders

Full 2013 Official Money List

Scoring average leaders

Full 2013 Scoring Average List

See also
2013 Ladies European Tour
2013 Symetra Tour

References

External links
Official site

LPGA Tour seasons
LPGA Tour